The Neighborhood is an American sitcom television series created by Jim Reynolds that premiered on CBS on October 1, 2018. In January 2019, CBS announced it had renewed the series for a second season, which premiered on September 23, 2019. In May 2020, the series was renewed for a third season which premiered on November 16, 2020. In February 2021, the series was renewed for a fourth season which premiered on September 20, 2021. In January 2022, CBS renewed the series for a fifth season which is set to premiere on September 19, 2022. In January 2023, CBS renewed the series for a sixth season.

Series overview

Episodes

Season 1 (2018–19)

Season 2 (2019–20)

Season 3 (2020–21)

Season 4 (2021–22)

Season 5 (2022–23)

Ratings

Season 1

Season 2

Season 3

Season 4

Season 5

Notes

References

The Neighborhood